Sant’Antonio da Padova is a small Roman Catholic Church, located at Piazza Sant'Antonio just outside what were the medieval walls of the town of Contigliano, in the province of Rieti, region of Lazio, Italy.

History 
The present church was built in 1734. The exterior has a subdued stucco decoration, including garlands in the triangular tympanum. The interior is highly decorated with white marble and gilded stucco. The ceiling is frescoed with trompe-l’oeil architecture, and grotteschi. The main altarpiece depicts St Antony praying to the child Jesus, painted by Girolamo Troppa. The Confraternity of Sant’Antonio is located adjacent to the church.

References

Roman Catholic churches in Lazio
Baroque architecture in Lazio
Francesco
Churches in the province of Rieti